Imputation in genetics refers to the statistical inference of unobserved genotypes. It is achieved by using known haplotypes in a population, for instance from the HapMap or the 1000 Genomes Project in humans, thereby allowing to test for association between a trait of interest (e.g. a disease) and experimentally untyped genetic variants, but whose genotypes have been statistically inferred ("imputed"). Genotype imputation is usually performed on SNPs, the most common kind of genetic variation.

Genotype imputation hence helps tremendously in narrowing down the location of probably causal variants in genome-wide association studies, because it increases the SNP density (the genome size remains constant, but the number of genetic variants increases) and thus reduces the distance between two adjacent SNPs.

Context
In genetic epidemiology and quantitative genetics, researchers aim at identifying genomic locations where variation between individuals is associated with variation in traits of interest between individuals. Such studies hence require access to the genetic makeup of a set of individuals. Sequencing the whole genome of each individual in the study is often too costly, so only a subset of the genome can therefore be measured. This often means, first, only considering single-nucleotide polymorphisms (SNPs) and neglecting copy number variants, and second, only measuring SNPs known to be variable enough in the population that they are likely to be also variable in the set of individuals under consideration. The most informative subset of SNPs is chosen based on the distribution of common genetic variation along the genome, for instance as produced by the HapMap or the 1000 Genomes Project in humans. These SNPs are then used to build a micro-array, thereby allowing each individual in the study to be genotyped at all these SNPs simultaneously.

Motivation
Genotyping arrays used for genome-wide association studies (GWAS) are based on tagging SNPs and therefore do not directly genotype all variation in the genome. Imputation of the genotypes to a reference panel that has been genotyped for a greater number of variants boosts the coverage of genomic variation beyond the original genotypes. As a consequence, one can assess the effect of more SNPs than those on the original micro-array. Importantly, imputation has facilitated meta-analysis of datasets that have been genotyped on different arrays, by increasing the overlap of variants available for analysis between arrays.

Tools
There are several software packages available to impute genotypes from a genotyping array to reference panels, such as 1000 Genomes Project haplotypes. These tools include MaCH Minimac, IMPUTE2 and Beagle. Each tool provides specific pros and cons in terms of speed and accuracy. Additional phasing tools such as SHAPEIT2 allow prephasing of input haplotypes for improved imputation accuracy and computational performance.

In early imputation usage, haplotypes from HapMap populations were used as a reference panel, but this has been succeeded by the availability of haplotypes from the 1000 Genomes Project as reference panels with more samples, across more diverse populations, and with greater genetic marker density. As of mid-2014, whole-genome sequence data is publicly available from the 1000 Genomes Project website for 2535 individuals from 26 different populations around the world.

Statistical models
Designing accurate statistical models for genotype imputation is very much related to the problem of haplotype estimation ("phasing") and is an active area of research.

See also
 List of haplotype estimation and genotype imputation software
 Haplotype estimation

References

Statistical genetics